Claudia Stolze is a German-British make-up artist. She was nominated for an Academy Award in the category Best Makeup and Hairstyling for the film Emma.

Selected filmography 
 Emma (2020; co-nominated with Marese Langan and Laura Allen)

References

External links 

Living people
Year of birth missing (living people)
Place of birth missing (living people)
German emigrants to the United Kingdom
German make-up artists
British make-up artists